HMS Spiteful was a  torpedo boat destroyer built at Jarrow, England, by Palmers Shipbuilding and Iron Company for the Royal Navy and launched in 1899. Specified to be able to steam at 30 knots, she spent her entire career serving in the seas around the British Isles.

In 1904 Spiteful's boilers were modified to burn fuel oil. Tests were conducted by the Royal Navy in that year, comparing her performance using oil directly with that of a similar ship using coal, in which it was proved that burning oil offered significant advantages. This led to the adoption of oil as the source of power for all warships built for the Royal Navy from 1912. She was sold and scrapped in 1920.

Design and construction
HMS Spiteful was one of about 60 torpedo boat destroyers built for use by the Royal Navy between 1893 and 1900 to the specifications of the Admiralty; she was also the 50th ship built for the Admiralty by Palmers Shipbuilding and Iron Company, and the 12th torpedo boat destroyer built by them. By the time of her construction, Palmers had come to be regarded as one of the "more successful builders [of this type of ship]". She was laid down on 12 January 1898 at Palmers' Jarrow shipyard and launched on 11 January 1899, at a cost of £50,977. She arrived at Portsmouth for completion on 31 August 1899, and this was achieved in February 1900.

Her design was a development of that for Palmers'  torpedo boat destroyers, which had been completed between 1897 and 1899, although most changes were minor. For example, whereas the Star-class ships had three funnels, of which the middle one was more substantial, Spiteful had four, of which the central two were grouped closely together. Her light displacement was 400 tons (406.4 tonnes).

In common with similar Royal Navy ships of the time, Spitefuls forecastle was of the "turtle-back" type with a rounded top: this design was intended to keep the forecastle clear of sea water, but in practice had the adverse effect of digging a ship's bow into the sea when it was rough, thereby making ships lose speed, besides making them "wet and uncomfortable". Wetness was mitigated by screening across the rear of the forecastle and around the forward gun position, a raised platform below which was the enclosed conning tower. A foremast stood behind the conning position and was fitted with a derrick. She was armed with a QF 12-pounder gun located in the forward gun position; five QF 6-pounder guns, four of which were arranged along her sides and one located centrally on a raised platform towards her stern, as a rear gun; and a pair of  torpedo tubes on a horizontally rotating mount located on deck towards the stern, ahead of the rear gun. The crew numbered 63 officers and men, for whom the accommodation on this type of ship was "very cramped; usually the captain had a small cabin but ... other officers lived in the wardroom." The remainder of the crew slept in hammocks. As ordered Spiteful probably carried four boats, comprising a gig, a dinghy and two lifeboats of the Berthon type.

Admiralty specifications in force at the time of her construction required that she should be able to steam at 30 knots, and from this she was one of a group of torpedo boat destroyers known informally as "30-knotters". Spitefuls propulsion was through two propellers, each driven by one of two triple expansion steam engines that were powered by four coal-fired Reed water tube boilers operated at 250 pounds per square inch (1,724 kilopascals) and could produce  indicated horsepower (IHP). In ships of her type the boilers were installed in a line fore-and-aft and in pairs, so that in each pair the furnace doors faced each other: thus one group of stokers could tend two boilers simultaneously, and only two boiler rooms, also known as stokeholds, were required. In sea trials it was found that, when run at 29.9 knots, she consumed  of coal per IHP per hour, which was considered low, and a speed of 30.371 knots was "easily maintained".

Torpedo boat destroyers of the 30-knotter specification featured watertight bulkheads that enabled them to remain afloat despite damage to their hulls, which were thin and lightly built for speed. Conversely the thinness of their hulls meant that they were easily damaged by stormy seas and careless handling. Those that were based in British ports, as Spiteful was, were originally painted black overall, but they would have been painted grey by about 1916, from which point they would also have had their pendant numbers painted on their bows.

At the time of their construction a specification of 30 knots made for a fast warship, but:

Otherwise,

These builders were all private British enterprises that had previously specialised in building torpedo boats, and, regarding their designs for 30-knotters, it was specified that they should be given  free a hand as possible". In 1996 David Lyon, curator of ships’ plans at the National Maritime Museum, wrote that Palmers' torpedo boat destroyers in particular "eventually would, by common consent, be considered the best all-rounders of all".

Service history

Spiteful always served within the vicinity of the British Isles. From 10 July to 3 August 1900 she was engaged in a naval exercise conducted in the Irish Sea, during which she was deemed to have been put out of action. From 11 January 1901 to 24 February 1902 at the latest she was captained by Commander Douglas Nicholson, who later became a vice admiral. In February 1901 she ran aground near the Isle of Wight, damaging her propellers, and was taken to Portsmouth dockyard for overhaul. On 23 October the same year, while off the north-eastern coast of England, she had a collision with her sister ship Peterel, in which her stem was twisted and her bow "partly torn away".
On 4 April 1905, while steaming at 22 knots near Yarmouth on the Isle of Wight, she collided with the barge Preciosa, which was carrying bags of cement. Damage to Spitefuls bow and forward superstructure was severe, but that damage was not greater was attributed to her "light build"; one of Spitefuls crew was slightly injured, but the barge sank and two of her crew drowned. On 5 August 1907, while she was raising steam at Cowes on the Isle of Wight, fuel oil was released under pressure from a disconnected burner, causing flames to fill the rear boiler room: two members of the crew were killed and two were injured. The magazines were flooded to protect them from the fire and, although it caused no structural damage, Spiteful was later towed to Portsmouth for inspection. She was part of the Portsmouth flotilla of the Home Fleet at the time. The event prompted the Admiralty to issue new instructions on the handling of fuel oil in its ships, particularly after overhaul.

From June 1914, one month before the outbreak of the First World War, the Royal Navy's Navy List records that she was based at Portsmouth as a tender for HMS Vernon, the Admiralty's torpedo training school: her "Chief Artificer Engineer" was based there, rather than on board. From August 1914 she was listed as still based at Portsmouth, but no longer as a tender for Vernon, although her chief artificer engineer remained there. From June 1915 she was listed as part of the Portsmouth Local Defence Flotilla. On 6 September 1916 she sighted a German submarine off Cape Barfleur, in the English Channel, forcing it to dive. From May to December 1918, by which time the war had ended, Spiteful was again listed as part of the Portsmouth Local Defence Flotilla, but also as a tender for "HMS Victory", as Portsmouth Naval Barracks were named at the time. From January to April 1919 she was listed only as based at Portsmouth, but in May that year she was listed as being based there without an officer in command. She did not appear in the Navy List again until January 1920, when she was listed as "To Be Sold". This occurred on 14 September 1920, and she was broken up at Hayes' yard, Porthcawl.

Fuel oil

Spiteful was instrumental in the Royal Navy's adoption of fuel oil as a source of power in place of coal. Her boilers were modified to burn only fuel oil as part of ongoing experiments and, on  1904, "vitally important" comparative trials were carried out near the Isle of Wight with Spitefuls sister ship Peterel burning coal, in which Spiteful performed significantly better. Problems with the production of smoke were surmounted so that using oil produced no more smoke than coal, and it was found that the ship's crew could be reduced, since fewer were required in the boiler rooms. Whereas Peterel required six stokers during the trials, Spiteful required only three boiler-room crew; while Peterels crew had to dispose of 1.5 tons (1.52 tonnes) of ash and clinker, Spiteful produced no such waste. Further, while Peterel took 1.5 hours to prepare for steaming, Spiteful took 10 minutes. In June 1906, the journal Scientific American journal reported that Spiteful was being used by the Admiralty to train engine-room crews in the operation of oil-burning equipment.

That a navy's reliance on coal entailed problems of logistics and strategy was understood well before the trials took place:

Thus Bacon argued that a navy reliant on coal must have a "coal strategy". Using fuel oil instead removed this strategic limitation and offered significant advantages:

In addition, construction costs for an oil-powered warship were lower by an average of 12.4% – a destroyer would be cheaper by a third – and carrying oil instead of coal meant that a warship's armaments and armour could be heavier.

Although the trials of 1904 proved the superiority of fuel oil over coal in powering warships, they did not lead to the immediate abandonment of coal as a source of power by the Royal Navy. While Britain's internal supply of coal was plentiful, it had no such supply of oil, either domestically or within its empire. William Palmer, who was First Lord of the Admiralty in 1904, regarded a change to oil as "impossible", for reasons of availability. This took time to overcome, but it was achieved through foreign policy and government activity in the oil market, beginning with the Royal Commission on Fuel and Engines of 1912. This was established by Winston Churchill, who was First Lord of the Admiralty at the time. The Navy committed itself to change in the same year, when all of the ships that it set out to procure were designed to use fuel oil.

References

Footnotes

Notes

Bibliography

B-class destroyers (1913)
Ships built on the River Tyne
1899 ships
World War I destroyers of the United Kingdom
Spiteful-class destroyers